Joe Shmoe (also spelled Joe Schmoe and Joe Schmo), meaning "Joe Anybody", or no one in particular, is a commonly used fictional name in American English. Adding a "Shm" to the beginning of a word is meant to diminish, negate, or dismiss an argument (for instance, "Rain, shmain, we've got a game to play"). It can also indicate that the speaker is being ironic or sarcastic. This process was adapted in English from the use of the "schm" prefix in Yiddish to dismiss something; as in, "Fancy, schmancy" (thus denying the claim that something is fancy). While "schmo" ("schmoo", "schmoe") is thought by some linguists to be a clipping of Yiddish שמוק "schmuck", that derivation is disputed.

See also
Average Joe
Joe Bloggs
John Doe
John Q. Public
Man on the street
Placeholder name
Tom, Dick and Harry
Zé Povinho

References 

Anonymity pseudonyms
Placeholder names